This is the list of all players drafted by HC Slovan Bratislava in Kontinental Hockey League since they joined the league in 2012.

Key

Draft picks

First round picks

Notes

All draft picks
Statistics are complete as of the end of 2016–17 KHL season and show each player's career regular season totals in the KHL. Wins, losses, shootouts played, shutout, save percentages and goals against average apply to goaltenders and are used only for players at that position.

See also
 2012 KHL Junior Draft
 2013 KHL Junior Draft

External links
 Official KHL Players' Statistics

HC Slovan Bratislava draft picks